Dachau Stadt station is a railway station in the town of Dachau in Upper Bavaria, Germany.

References

External links

Munich S-Bahn stations
Railway stations in Bavaria
Railway stations in Germany opened in 1912
Buildings and structures in Dachau (district)